Six pieces for piano may refer to:

 Six Pieces for Piano, Op. 118 by Johannes Brahms
 Sei pezzi per pianoforte by Ottorino Respighi